Wilson Odobert (born 28 November 2004) is a French professional footballer who plays as a winger for  club Troyes.

Club career 
A youth product of USF Trilport and Paris Saint-Germain, Odobert was offered a professional contract with the latter in January 2022 after strong performances with the club's under-19 sides. He rejected the offer, and on 15 July 2022, transferred to Troyes, signing a three-year contract. Odobert made his professional debut with Troyes in a 3–2 Ligue 1 loss to Montpellier on 7 August 2022. He scored his first professional goal in a 3–1 league win over Angers on 28 August, becoming the second-youngest league goalscorer in Troyes's history.

International career
Odobert is a youth international for France, having represented the France U16s and U18s.

References

External links
 
 FFF profile

2004 births
Living people
People from Meaux
French footballers
France youth international footballers
Paris Saint-Germain F.C. players
ES Troyes AC players
Ligue 1 players
Association football wingers